Vernon Paris (born January 5, 1988) is an American professional boxer who fights at light welterweight. He had three fights result in no contests because he tested positive for marijuana at the post-fight drug tests.

Personal life
Paris grew up in Detroit, Michigan where he grew up a troubled youth. He was involved in gangs and committed petty crimes, this culminated in a shooting which occurred on the city's northwest side on the evening of July 25, 2006: Paris was shot three times: in the back, thigh, and groin. As a result of this attempted murder he still has a bullet lodged in his back and thigh.

In May 2008, Paris was stabbed while being involved in a neighborhood argument and suffered a collapsed lung. Afterwards, Paris left for Florida to be with his girlfriend and family. He returning to Michigan in late 2009 to resume his fighting career along with his friend and promoter, Carlos Llinas.

Career

Amateur career
Paris, who had been a professional for six years, had been a gifted boxer since his amateur days when he trained under Kronk Gym mentor, Sugar Hill, nephew of Emanuel Steward.

Professional career
Paris, who was signed by Don King in 2011, made his breakthrough as a professional with wins over Tim Coleman, Emanuel Augustus, and Ruben Galvan, and was named one of the sport's upcoming stars by The Boxing Tribune.

On March 24, 2012, Paris faced Zab Judah (41-7, 28 KOs) in an IBF light welterweight title elimination bout as the main event of NBC Sports Network's Fight Night from the Aviator Arena in Brooklyn, New York. Paris lost the bout in the 9th round via a TKO. Paris currently trains with Dave Lester.

Professional boxing record

|-
| style="text-align:center;" colspan="8"|34 fights, 29 wins (17 knockouts), 2 losses (1 knockout), 3 no contests
|-  style="text-align:center; background:#e3e3e3;"
|  style="border-style:none none solid solid; "|Res.
|  style="border-style:none none solid solid; "|Record
|  style="border-style:none none solid solid; "|Opponent
|  style="border-style:none none solid solid; "|Type
|  style="border-style:none none solid solid; "|Rd., Time
|  style="border-style:none none solid solid; "|Date
|  style="border-style:none none solid solid; "|Location
|  style="border-style:none none solid solid; "|Notes
|- align=center
| Loss
|28-2
|align=left| Frankie Gómez
|
| 
|
|align=left| 
|align=left|
|- align=center
|Win
|28–1
|align=left| Manuel Pérez
|
| 
|
|align=left| 
|align=left|
|- align=center
| Win
|27–1
|align=left| Guy Packer
|
| 
|
|align=left| 
|align=left|
|- align=center
| Loss
|26–1
|align=left| Zab Judah
|
|
|
|align=left| 
|align=left|
|- align=center 
| Win
|26–0
|align=left| Rubén Galván
|
| 
|
|align=left| 
|align=left|
|- align=center 
| Win
|25–0
|align=left| Tim Coleman
|
| 
|
|align=left| 
|align=left|
|- align=center 
| Win
|24–0
|align=left| Emanuel Augustus
|
| 
|
|align=left| 
|align=left|
|- align=center 
| Win
|23–0
|align=left| Ramon Guevara
|
| 
|
|align=left| 
|align=left|
|- align=center 
| Win
|22–0
|align=left| Courtney Burton
|
|
|
|align=left| 
|align=left|
|- align=center
| Win
|21–0
|align=left| Juan Santiago
|
| 
|
|align=left| 
|align=left|
|- align=center
| Win
|20–0
|align=left| Oscar León
|
| 
|
|align=left| 
|align=left|
|- align=center
| Win
|19–0
|align=left| Corey Alarcon
|
| 
|
|align=left| 
|align=left|
|- align=center
| Win
|18–0
|align=left| Damon Antoine
|
|
|
|align=left| 
|align=left|
|- align=center
| Win
|17–0
|align=left| Jesse Francisco
|
| 
|
|align=left| 
|align=left|

References

External links

Records for Vernon Paris from FightNights

1988 births
Living people
Boxers from Detroit
American male boxers
Light-welterweight boxers